The GS&WR McDonnell 2-4-0 types were a set of passenger locomotive classes introduced on the Great Southern and Western Railway (GS&WR) of Ireland by its locomotive engineer Alexander McDonnell between about 1868 and 1877.

History
Alexander McDonnell joined the GS&WR as locomotive superintendent in 1864, replacing John Wakefield. McDonnell brought experience from the London & North Western Railway at Crewe and was impressed by the designs being produced by Beyer, Peacock & Company of Manchester at that time. McDonnell used designs from Beyer Peacock as the basis for the GS&WR Class 101  goods locomotive which was to become the most numerous type in Ireland. The Dublin to Cork express services were powered by Wakefield's  locomotives and McDonnell in 1968 again turned to Beyer-Peacock drawings to direct Inchicore to produce six passenger express  locomotives with  driving wheels and  cylinders for express passenger work.

A smaller design suitable for secondary passenger duties with  wheels and  cylinders was produced from 1869.  While McDonnell aimed for standardisation locomotives were sometimes included parts reclaimed from scrapped locomotives for economy reasons. Additional batches of both the express and secondary types were built with a number of variations.

The larger  locomotives were all withdrawn before the start of the twentieth century, Three of the lighter type built in 1873 survived until amalgamation to Great Southern Railways in 1925 though were withdrawn shortly thereafter in 1928.

Fleet

Legacy
McDonnell developed the lightweight  into the Kerry bogie  in 1877 with the addition of a swing-link bogie mechanism used in American practice.  Henry Ivatt later used the lightweight design as the basis for his  tank locomotives.  The larger express passenger locomotive was a predecessor to the Aspinall GS&WR Class 52 and 60, which in turn led through to the Robert Coey  passenger locomotives.

References

Notes

Footnotes

Sources
 
 
 
 

2-4-0 locomotives
5 ft 3 in gauge locomotives
Railway locomotives introduced in 1868
Steam locomotives of Ireland
Scrapped locomotives